Grenville J. R. Kent (born 1965) is an Australian academic, film producer, author, and Christian communicator. He is the producer of Big Questions, a forthcoming documentary series examining faith, and the "10 Questions for God" series of booklets. He has earned a PhD from the University of Manchester, England, and a D.Min from the Australian College of Theology, and taught Cultural Apologetics (Arts/Theology) and Old Testament at the Wesley Institute (now Excelsia College) in Sydney.

Biography 
Grenville Kent is producer of Big Questions. The pilot episode, "Does God Exist? Part 1" examines flight and compares design features of the albatross and the Airbus A380. It includes interviews with two Oxford University professors: atheist Peter Atkins and John Lennox, a Christian. It was shot in New Zealand, Hungary, England, France and Australia. Kent is co-presenter alongside his seven-year-old son Marcus. Future episodes will discuss consciousness, space and the stars, human morality, and whether God genuinely spoke through the Bible.

Kent taught Old Testament and Cultural Apologetics (Arts/Theology) at the Wesley Institute from 2003 to 2013. His PhD from the University of Manchester is in Old Testament literature, and examines the Witch of En-Dor narrative in  using film theory. His DMin is in Apologetics (the rational explanation of Christianity) and looks at factors influencing Australians towards and away from belief in God.  His MA (Theol) from Morling College studied the Song of Solomon, a piece of Biblical erotica. His MA (Film) was from the University of Technology, Sydney. He also earned a Grad. Cert. Commerce (Marketing) from the University of New South Wales, a BA (Theol) from Pacific Union College, and a BA (Mass Communication) from the University of Technology Sydney.

Kent's memberships include the Society of Biblical Literature and the Evangelical Theological Society in the United States, and the Tyndale Fellowship in the United Kingdom. He has guest-lectured in the Philippines and Trinidad. He has presented papers at the annual Society of Biblical Literature meetings.

He has presented on Christian apologetics for the Cambridge Scholars Network, European Leadership Forum (Hungary) and Campus Life, and travels internationally as a youth outreach speaker across several Christian denominations.  He is a frequent presenter on Christian TV programs.

Kent started "Church With No Ties" as a youth pastor and university chaplain. Kent's speaking appointments have included men's conferences, theology congresses camp meetings, and many others.

Publications 
Kent has authored dozens of articles, the "10 Questions for God" Bible study series, films, comic books (graphic novels), books, and book chapters.

Books 
 Say It Again, Sam: A Literary and Filmic Study of Narrative Repetition in 1 Samuel 28. Pickwick, 2011. About the witch of Endor
 Grenville Kent, forthcoming commentary on Song of Songs
 Grenville Kent and Philip Rodionoff, The Da Vinci Decode (Victoria, Australia: Signs, 2006); ; book website; a critique of Dan Brown's 2003 novel The Da Vinci Code. Also published in Portuguese and Czech.
 Christina Hawkins, Warwick Bagg, and Grenville Kent; Health (Berkeley Vale, New South Wales: Sanitarium Health Food Company, 1999) (Kent was one editor for a series of 12 booklets)
 Grenville Kent, Millennium (Sydney: Religious Education Media Australia, 1996); 
 Grenville Kent, The Siege (Sydney: self-published, 1994); 
 Grenville Kent, What Future? The Forgotten Dream (Sydney: self-published, 1994);

Book chapters and scholarly articles 
Scholarly articles:
 'Preaching Old Testament Narratives’, Southeastern Theological Review 2/1 (Summer 2011) 11–24. 
 ‘Mary Magdalene, Mary of Bethany and the sinful woman of Luke 7: the same person?’ Journal of the Asia Adventist Seminary 13.1 (2010): 13–28. 
 Book review of Theology and Film: Challenging the Sacred/Secular Divide by Christopher Deacy and Gaye Williams Ortiz. European Journal of Theology 18:1 (2009), p80–81

Book chapters:
 ‘The Heavens Are Telling: A Biblically Informed Cosmology’, in Bryan W. Ball (ed), In The Beginning: Science and Scripture Confirm Creation (Boise: Pacific Press, 2012), 171–183.  
 ‘"His Desire Is For Her": Feminist readings of the Song of Solomon’, in Andrew Sloane (ed.), Tamar’s Tears: Evangelical Engagements with Feminist Old Testament Hermeneutics (Eugene: Wipf and Stock, 2011), 217–245.
 Grenville J. R. Kent, Paul J. Kissling, and Laurence A. Turner, eds., Reclaiming the Old Testament for Christian Preaching (Inter-Varsity Press, 2010), publisher's page. Kent also wrote the chapter, "Preaching the Song of Songs". The book won the annual Preaching Today award for the "Enhancing the Preacher's Skill" category. An alternative title is He Began with Moses: Preaching the Old Testament today (Inter-Varsity Press, 2010), publisher's page.
 'Did The Medium at En-Dor Really Bring Forth Samuel?', in Gerhard Pfandl (ed.), Interpreting Scripture: Bible Questions and Answers: Biblical Research Institute Studies, vol. 2 (Silver Spring: Biblical Research Institute, 2010), 196–200. 
 "Pop Culture: My Angel Goes to Movies" in Andy Nash, ed., Unleash the Dream: A New Generation Challenges the Church They Love (Hagerstown, MD: Review and Herald, 1999), p52–62; publisher's page

Additionally, Kent has many stories published in the "Australian Stories" series of books, which are published from Sydney by Strand:
 Australian Stories of Life ed. David and Rachel Dixon (2005) chapters "Hardly Davidson", "Bowled Over", and "Oink!"<ref>Pages 61–62, 123–125, and 166–167 respectively. They originally appeared in ``Signs of the Times March 1992, May 1996, and August 1993 respectively</ref>

 Inspirational Australian Stories ed. David and Rachel Dixon (2004) chapters "Common Scents", "Going Off", "The Game They Play in Heaven", and "When Is an Atheist Not an Atheist?"

 Australian Stories for the Spirit (2003), one chapter
 Australian Stories for the Heart (2002) chapters "I'm Rich!", "Hedonists Don't Get No Satisfaction", and "Meeting the Godfather"

 Films and documentaries 
Kent has produced the following films:
 Big Questions documentary series
 The Cross, a 2000 short film written and directed by Kent"Cross, The ". Screen Australia website, accessed September 2009
 Cushy Job: Rwanda Volunteer, a 1995 short film written and directed by Kent
 What Future? A 1994 short film co-written and co-directed by Kent
 Alcheringa'', a 1993 short film written by Kent

References

External links 
 "10 Questions for God" study series, authored by Kent
 Grenville Kent at the Screen Australia website

1965 births
Living people
Australian religious writers
Australian film producers
Australian evangelicals
Australian Seventh-day Adventists